Moskal, also known as Muscal, is a historical designation used for the residents of the Grand Duchy of Moscow from the 12th to the 15th centuries. 

It is now sometimes used in Belarus, Ukraine, and Poland, but also in Romania, as an ethnic slur for Russians. The term is generally considered to be derogatory or condescending and reciprocal to the Russian term khokhol for Ukrainians. Another ethnic slur for Russians is kacap in Polish, or katsap (Кацап) in Ukrainian.

History and etymology 
Initially, as early as the 12th century, moskal referred to the residents of "Moscovia", the word literally translating as "Muscovite" (differentiating the residents of the Grand Duchy of Moscow from other East Slavs such as people from White Ruthenia (Belarusians), Red Ruthenia (Ukrainians), and others). With time, the word became an archaism in all the East Slavic languages, and survived only as a family name in each of those languages—see below.

The negative connotation, however, came in around the late 18th-early 19th centuries in the form of an ethnic slur labelling all Russians. At that time, soldiers of the Imperial Russian Army (and later those of the Soviet Army) stationed in parts of present-day Poland, Romania and Ukraine became known as muscals.

Cultural influence
"Moskal" is a stock character of the traditional Ukrainian puppet theatre form, vertep.

Moskaliki is a Ukrainian designation for small fish typically used as bait or as a casual snack.

It also gave rise to a number of East Slavic family names.

See also
 Anti-Russian sentiment in Ukraine
 List of ethnic slurs
 Vatnik (slang)

References

External links
  Search query in Russian-Ukrainian dictionaries

Pejorative terms for European people
Anti-Russian sentiment